The Mt. Olive Rosenwald School, on Bradley Rd. 45 in Mt. Olive, Bradley County, Arkansas is a wood frame Colonial Revival schoolhouse built in 1927. It is one of five buildings in the county that was funded by The Rosenwald Fund, established by philanthropist Julius Rosenwald to further the education of rural African Americans. It is not known when the building ceased to be used as a school, but classes were offered as late as 1949.

The building is a basic T shape, with a center entry, classrooms on either side of the entry, and an auditorium in the rear.

The building was listed on the National Register of Historic Places in 2004.

See also
National Register of Historic Places listings in Bradley County, Arkansas

References

School buildings on the National Register of Historic Places in Arkansas
Colonial Revival architecture in Arkansas
1927 establishments in Arkansas
Educational institutions established in 1927
National Register of Historic Places in Bradley County, Arkansas
Historically segregated African-American schools in Arkansas
Rosenwald schools in Arkansas